Crooked House is an Agatha Christie novel.

Crooked House may also refer to:

Arts
 Crooked House (TV series), a 2008 BBC TV series
 Crooked House (film), a 2017 film directed by Gilles Paquet-Brenner
 "—And He Built a Crooked House—", a short story by Robert A. Heinlein
 The Mystery At The Crooked House, the 79th book in the Boxcar Children Series

Business
 The Crooked House, a public house in Dudley, England
 Crooked House of Windsor, a tea house in Windsor, Berkshire, England
 The Crooked House bookshop opposite King's School, Canterbury, England

See also
 Krzywy Domek, the 'Crooked House' in Sopot, Poland